Trimukhi Parbat is a mountain of the Garhwal Himalaya in Uttarakhand India.The elevation of Trimukhi Parbat is  and its prominence is . It is 99th highest located entirely within the Uttrakhand. Nanda Devi, is the highest mountain in this category. It lies 2.8 km NE of Sri Kailash  its nearest higher neighbor and 1.9 km south of Trimukhi East . It lies 7.9 km North of Pilapani Parbat . It is located 8.3 km NE of Yogeshwar  and 16.4 km east lies Tara .

Climbing history
An Indian Army team, led by Major Bhajan Singh Bisht, climbed Trimukhi Parbat (6422 meters, 21,070 feet) on June 27, 1994. this was the first ascent of this peak. They approached through the Jadhganga valley via Bhairon Ghati. Before that they climbed Nandi (5795 meters, 19,012 feet), and then  East Trimukhi Parbat (6280 meters, 20,604 feet). These were second ascents of these peaks since they had been climbed by Harish Kapadia and Monish Devjani in 1990. The peak was climbed by Bisht, Lance Naiks Arjun Dev, Hardiyal Singh, Har Mohan Singh and Mohinder Singh and Havildar Atma Singh.  A team comprising Harish Kapadia Monesh Devjani and supported by Pasang Bodh and Yograj Buruwa of Manali. venture in this area in May 1990 after J. B. Auden visited the area in 1939. They climbed P 5794 and Trimukhi East but realized that Trimukhi Parbat is difficult for there small party.

Neighboring and subsidiary peaks
neighboring or subsidiary peaks of Trimukhi Parbat:
 Sri Kailash: 
 Pilapani Parbat: 
 Sudarshan: 
 Mana Parbat I: 
 Chaturbhuj  
 Matri 
 Sudarshan Parbat 
 Kalidhang

Glaciers and rivers
On the Eastern side, Trimukhi Glacier on the western side and Lambigad Glacier both this glacier drains down to Jadh Ganga which also met Bhagirathi river near Bharionghati. Bhagirathi joins the Alaknanda River the other main tributaries of river Ganga at Dev Prayag and called Ganga there after.

See also

 List of Himalayan peaks of Uttarakhand

References

Mountains of Uttarakhand
Six-thousanders of the Himalayas
Geography of Chamoli district